Sarab Khoshkeh-ye Sofla (also Romanized as Sarāb Khoshkeh-ye Soflá and Sarāb-e Khoshkeh-ye Soflá; also known as Sarāb Khoshkeh-ye Pā’īn) is a village in Baladarband Rural District, in the Central District of Kermanshah County, Kermanshah Province, Iran. At the 2006 census, its population was 62, in 15 families.

References 

Populated places in Kermanshah County